John Cox Atlee (October 30, 1882 – August 2, 1958) was an American athlete.  He competed at the 1908 Summer Olympics in London.

In the 400 meters, Atlee won his preliminary heat with a time of 50.4 seconds to advance to the semifinals.  There, he finished third and last in his heat and did not move on to the final.

References

Sources
 
 
 

1882 births
1958 deaths
Athletes (track and field) at the 1908 Summer Olympics
Olympic track and field athletes of the United States
American male sprinters
20th-century American people